Northern Soul is the debut album by the British dance band M People. It was originally released on 4 November 1991. After the release of the single "Excited", a new song not originally included on the album, it was re-released with an updated track listing in late 1992, reaching number 53 on the UK albums chart. Following the success of the band's later albums, Elegant Slumming and Bizarre Fruit, this second version was re-issued in October 1995 and charted at number 26. The album is dedicated to Ritchie Close.

Track listing 
All songs written by Mike Pickering and Paul Heard except where noted.

Original CD version

Original LP version

Side one

Side two

1992 CD re-release 

Note: The track list is absent from the rear of the 1992 re-release cover, only being displayed on the actual disc and liner notes.

1992 LP and Cassette re-release

Side one

Side two

2005 re-release (remastered)

References 

1991 debut albums
M People albums